John Rudder, PhD, has studied the Australian Aboriginal languages, of Arnhem Land (Gupapuyngu) in the Northern Territory and the state of New South Wales (Wiradjuri), Australia.

Work
In 1964, Rudder went to Arnhem Land as a teacher, and later as a community development worker and educator among adult Indigenous Australians. In that time he learned to speak the language of the region, and analysed its grammar and syntax.

He sought to gain formal educational qualifications after moving to Canberra, and has since gained a master's degree in Anthropology focussing on Aboriginal Classificatory Theory and Cognitive Structures and a Doctor of Philosophy degree in Aboriginal Anthropology focusing on Yolngu Cosmology (focusing on beliefs regarding the nature of existence and how the world is ordered.)

Language teaching

From 1993 to 2010, Rudder was heavily involved with Stan Grant Sr, an elder of the Wiradjuri people, in reclaiming the Wiradjuri language that was at that time effectively dead. He took anthropological studies and records amounting to the records of fewer than 2,000 words and applied the language and cognitive analysis he had previously applied to the Yolngu language, to begin to reconstruct the Wiradjuri language. With Grant, who provided a sense of the language remembered from his youth in World War II among Wiradjuri-speaking family and tribal members, notably his grandfather, they have established training sessions to teach the language across Wiradjuri country. Intensive weekend camps, workshops, and other sessions have seen a growing number of Wiradjuri speakers who are beginning to re-establish the language. For instance, these speakers are beginning to write songs and poems that are then being taught to children.

Secondary effects of the cultural use of the Wiradjuri language are being felt within the language group, and beyond. Examples are:
 recognition of the Wiradjuri as a cultural group within the wider society
 use of Wiradjuri words in communities, and in Australian usage
 teaching of Wiradjuri to New South Wales Primary School children

Art
Rudder has been an artist for many years, previously entering the Blake Prize for Religious Art. He recently returned to painting, and his entry was selected for display in the exhibition of the inaugural Phoenix Prize for spiritual art in 2005.

Personal life
Rudder has been a member of the Uniting Church in Australia.

Until her death in 2008 he was married to Trixie, a part-time lay pastor for a congregation of the Uniting Church at Gunning, near Canberra.

In December 2010 he remarried and moved to Sydney. His second wife Dr Julie Waddy PhD OAM worked as an ethnobiologist and linguist working with the Anglican Church Missionary Society on Groote Eylandt in the Northern Territory with the aboriginal people for 30 years, and returned to Sydney in 2005.

John says that his relationships – what most white Australians would call friendships and family – are mostly with the Aboriginal people.

John passed away on the afternoon of the 24, July 2021.

Publications

Rudder has self-published a book on the counting (relationship) system of Australian Aborigines, has produced teaching materials for his courses in aboriginal speaking and thought, and is in the process of completing an Aboriginal–English dictionary. His recent writing has been extensively in collaboration with Stan Grant.

Rudder's publications include:
 Rudder, John; Yolngu Cosmology: An Unchanging Cosmos Incorporating a Rapidly Changing World, DPhil thesis, Australian National University, 1993
 An Introduction to Aboriginal Art
 An Introduction to Aboriginal Mathematics
 The Natural World of the Yolngu: The Aboriginal People of North East Arnhem Land
 Aboriginal Religion and the Dreaming
 The Bark Paintings of North East Arnhem Land
 Learning Wiradjuri 1–5 (graded texts)
 Learning Wiradjuri 1&2 CD
 A Teaching Wiradjuri Support CD
 Eric Looks for a Friend (PowerPoint book)
 Wiradjuri Language Songs for Children
 Wiradjuri Language Song Book 2
 CD of Wiradjuri Language Songs
 Wiradjuri Language – How it works: A Grammar in Everyday English
 Wiradjuri Language A First Dictionary of Wiradjuri
 Wiradjuri Sentence Book
 Wiradjuri Language Black Line Poster Masters
 Wiradjuri Language Black Line Masters – Book 1 (Colouring-in)
 Wiradjuri Language Black Line Masters –Book 2– Learn to Draw
 Wiradjuri Language Colouring-in Books 1 and 2
 Wiradjuri Language Learn to Draw Books 1 and 2
 English Language Blackline Poster Masters of Australian Natural Science & People
 Unlabelled Blackline Poster Masters of Australian Natural Science & People
 Towards Holiness, (2007), Restoration House

In July 2006, the Parkes Shire Library (central west NSW) inaugurated its collection of books on Wiradjuri attended by Wiradjuri language students from Primary schools at Forbes, Peak Hill and Central West Christian School, whose teachers were learning from Rudder and Grant.

See also
List of Indigenous Australian group names
 Yolngu
 Yolngu Matha
 Wiradjuri
 Wiradjuri language

Notes

Citations

External links
 profiles of John Rudder and Stan Grant
 Aboriginal cultural and Yolngu publications
 Wiradjuri language publications

Sources

Linguists from Australia
Uniting Church in Australia people
Living people
Year of birth missing (living people)